The R739 road is a regional road in Ireland which links Kilmore Quay with the N25 in County Wexford.

The road passes through Ballykelly, Ballycogley and Kilmore.

See also 
 Roads in Ireland
 National primary road

References 

Regional roads in the Republic of Ireland
Roads in County Wexford